Leanne Margaret Albon (born 7 November 1959) is an Australian former cricketer. She played four one day internationals for the Australia national women's cricket team in the 1980s.

Albon played as an opening bat with the Victorian state women's cricket team.

References

External links
 Lee Albon at CricketArchive
 Lee Albon at southernstars.org.au

Living people
1959 births
Australia women One Day International cricketers
Sportswomen from Victoria (Australia)
Cricketers from Melbourne
Victoria women cricketers